I Want to Talk About You is an album by David Murray on the Italian Black Saint label released in 1989. It features a live performance by Murray, John Hicks, Ray Drummond and Ralph Peterson.

Track listing
 "Heart to Heart" (Hicks) - 12:48  
 "Quads" (Drummond) - 6:58  
 "Red Car" (Morris) - 8:37  
 "I Want to Talk About You" (Eckstine) - 13:40  
 "Morning Song" (Murray) - 14:10  
Recorded at Charlie's Tap, Boston, March 1, 1986

Personnel
David Murray: tenor saxophone, bass clarinet
John Hicks: piano
Ray Drummond: bass
Ralph Peterson: drums

References

1985 live albums
David Murray (saxophonist) live albums
Black Saint/Soul Note live albums